The 2013–14 Toronto Raptors season is the 19th season of the franchise in the National Basketball Association (NBA). In the offseason, they traded Andrea Bargnani away to the New York Knicks for a 2016 first-round draft pick, a 2014 second-round draft pick, a 2017 second-round draft pick, Steve Novak, Quentin Richardson and Marcus Camby. The Raptors were not expected to make the 2014 playoffs however, with a weak Atlantic Division they found themselves as contenders for the Atlantic Division title despite an early losing record. On December 9, 2013 the Raptors traded Rudy Gay, Quincy Acy, and Aaron Gray to the Sacramento Kings for John Salmons, Greivis Vásquez, Patrick Patterson, and Chuck Hayes. The Rudy Gay trade was marked as a turning point for the Raptors as they went on a 10-2 run from a 6-12 record maintaining their division lead and finishing the season with a 48-34 record, their best in franchise history at that time, qualifying for the playoffs for the first time since 2008. The record consisted of a 26-15 home record, their best since 2001, and a 22-19 road record, their best in franchise history at that time.  They also clinched the Atlantic Division title and the No. 3 seed for the first time since 2007. However, the Raptors were eliminated by the Brooklyn Nets led by Paul Pierce and Kevin Garnett in an intense seven game first round series.

Key dates
 June 27: The 2013 NBA draft took place at the Barclays Center in Brooklyn, New York, however the Raptors did not have any selections to make.

Pre-season

|- style="background:#cfc;"
| 1
| October 7
| @ Boston
| 
| Gay & Hansbrough (17)
| Jonas Valančiūnas (10)
| Kyle Lowry (5)
| TD Garden (16,424)
| 1–0
|- style="background:#fcc;"
| 2
| October 9
| Minnesota
| 
| DeMar DeRozan (17)
| Tyler Hansbrough (7)
| Kyle Lowry (4)
| Air Canada Centre (17,261)
| 1–1
|- style="background:#cfc;"
| 3
| October 11
| New York
| 
| DeMar DeRozan (20)
| Rudy Gay (6)
| DeRozan & Buycks (2)
| Air Canada Centre (15,357)
| 2–1
|- style="background:#cfc;"
| 4
| October 12
| @ Minnesota
| 
| Austin Daye (12)
| Amir Johnson (7)
| Dwight Buycks (7)
| Target Center (10,106)
| 3–1
|- style="background:#cfc;"
| 5
| October 16
| Boston
| 
| Terrence Ross (19)
| Quincy Acy (8)
| Dwight Buycks (5)
| Air Canada Centre (13,331)
| 4–1
|- style="background:#cfc;"
| 6
| October 21
| New York
| 
| Terrence Ross (27)
| Jonas Valančiūnas (9)
| Gay, Valančiūnas, Lowry, Fields, Buycks, Stone (3)
| Air Canada Centre (15,701)
| 5–1
|- style="background:#cfc;"
| 7
| October 23
| Memphis
| 
| DeMar DeRozan (21)
| Jonas Valančiūnas (9)
| Kyle Lowry (10)
| Air Canada Centre (14,421)
| 6–1
|- style="background:#fcc;"
| 8
| October 25
| @ Milwaukee
| 
| Rudy Gay (6)
| D. J. Augustin (2)
| DeMar DeRozan (1)
| BMO Harris Bradley Center
| 6–2

Roster

Regular season

Game log

|- style="background:#cfc;"
| 1
| October 30
| Boston
| 
| Rudy Gay (19)
| Tyler Hansbrough (12)
| Kyle Lowry (8)
| Air Canada Centre (20,155)
| 1–0

|- style="background:#fcc;"
| 2
| November 1
| @ Atlanta
| 
| DeMar DeRozan (31)
| Landry Fields (9)
| Lowry & Augustin (4)
| Philips Arena (18,118)
| 1–1
|- style="background:#cfc;"
| 3
| November 2
| @ Milwaukee
| 
| Rudy Gay (18)
| Rudy Gay (15)
| DeMar DeRozan (5)
| BMO Harris Bradley Center (16,046)
| 2–1
|- style="background:#fcc;"
| 4
| November 5
| Miami
| 
| DeMar DeRozan (21)
| Rudy Gay (10)
| Kyle Lowry (5)
| Air Canada Centre (18,470)
| 2–2
|- style="background:#fcc;"
| 5
| November 6
| @ Charlotte
| 
| Rudy Gay (20)
| Jonas Valančiūnas (10)
| Kyle Lowry (6)
| Time Warner Cable Arena (11,118)
| 2–3
|- style="background:#fcc;"
| 6
| November 8
| @ Indiana
| 
| Rudy Gay (30)
| Amir Johnson (10)
| Kyle Lowry (8)
| Bankers Life Fieldhouse (13,316)
| 2–4
|- style="background:#cfc;"
| 7
| November 9
| Utah
| 
| Tyler Hansbrough (23)
| Amir Johnson (11)
| Rudy Gay (5)
| Air Canada Centre (17,211)
| 3–4
|- style="background:#fcc;"
| 8
| November 11
| @ Houston
| 
| Rudy Gay (29)
| Jonas Valančiūnas (13)
| Jonas Valančiūnas (3)
| Toyota Center (18,134)
| 3–5
|- style="background:#cfc;"
| 9
| November 13
| @ Memphis
| 
| Rudy Gay (23)
| Jonas Valančiūnas (7)
| Kyle Lowry (6)
| FedExForum (15,971)
| 4–5
|- style="background:#fcc;"
| 10
| November 15
| Chicago
| 
| DeMar DeRozan (37)
| Rudy Gay (9)
| Kyle Lowry (8)
| Air Canada Centre (19,800)
| 4–6
|- style="background:#fcc;"
| 11
| November 17
| Portland
| 
| Rudy Gay (30)
| Rudy Gay (10)
| Kyle Lowry (10)
| Air Canada Centre (17,945)
| 4–7
|- style="background:#cfc;"
| 12
| November 20
| @ Philadelphia
| 
| DeMar DeRozan (33)
| Gay & Hansbrough (8)
| Kyle Lowry (10)
| Wells Fargo Center (10,787)
| 5–7
|- style="background:#cfc;"
| 13
| November 22
| Washington
| 
| DeRozan & Gay (17)
| Jonas Valančiūnas (13)
| Kyle Lowry (9)
| Air Canada Centre (18,671)
| 6–7
|- style="background:#fcc;"
| 14
| November 26
| Brooklyn
| 
| DeMar DeRozan (27)
| Hansbrough & Valančiūnas (7)
| Kyle Lowry (6)
| Air Canada Centre (16,421)
| 6–8
|- style="background:#fcc;"
| 15
| November 29
| Miami
| 
| DeMar DeRozan (25)
| Tyler Hansbrough (12)
| Kyle Lowry (6)
| Air Canada Centre (18,290)
| 6–9

|- style="background:#fcc;"
| 16
| December 1
| Denver
| 
| Rudy Gay (23)
| Jonas Valančiūnas (11)
| Kyle Lowry (7)
| Air Canada Centre (16,290)
| 6–10
|- style="background:#fcc;"
| 17
| December 3
| @ Golden State
| 
| DeMar DeRozan (26)
| Amir Johnson (10)
| Kyle Lowry (9)
| Oracle Arena (19,596)
| 6–11
|- style="background:#fcc;"
| 18
| December 6
| @ Phoenix
| 
| Amir Johnson (22)
| Gay & Valančiūnas (10)
| Kyle Lowry (7)
| US Airways Center (12,672)
| 6–12
|- style="background:#cfc;"
| 19
| December 8
| @ L.A. Lakers
| 
| Amir Johnson (32)
| Amir Johnson (10)
| Kyle Lowry (8)
| Staples Center (18,997)
| 7–12
|- style="background:#fcc;"
| 20
| December 10
| San Antonio
| 
| DeRozan & Johnson (19)
| Amir Johnson (9)
| DeRozan & Lowry (9)
| Air Canada Centre (17,702)
| 7–13
|- style="background:#cfc;"
| 21
| December 13
| Philadelphia
| 
| DeMar DeRozan (27)
| Jonas Valančiūnas (13)
| Kyle Lowry (11)
| Air Canada Centre (17,133)
| 8–13
|-  style="background:#cfc;"
| 22
| December 14
| @ Chicago
| 
| Kyle Lowry (16)
| Jonas Valančiūnas (11)
| Lowry & Vásquez (6)
| United Center (21,386)
| 9–13
|-  style="background:#fcc;"
| 23
| December 18
| Charlotte
| 
| DeMar DeRozan (30)
| Amir Johnson (13)
|  Greivis Vásquez (8)
| Air Canada Centre (15,201)
|  9–14
|- style="background:#cfc;"
| 24
| December 20
| @ Dallas
| 
| Kyle Lowry (20)
| Jonas Valančiūnas (13)
| DeMar DeRozan (9)
| American Airlines Center (19,406)
| 10–14
|- style="background:#cfc;"
| 25
| December 22
| @ Oklahoma City
| 
| Kyle Lowry (22)
| Amir Johnson (13)
| Kyle Lowry (9)
| Chesapeake Energy Arena (18,203)
| 11–14
|- style="background:#fcc;"
| 26
| December 23
| @ San Antonio
| 
| Ross & Lowry (23)
|  Jonas Valančiūnas (9)
| Kyle Lowry (9)
| AT&T Center (18,581)
| 11–15
|- style="background:#cfc;"
| 27
| December 27
| @ New York
| 
| DeMar DeRozan (25)
| Jonas Valančiūnas (18)
| Kyle Lowry (11)
| Madison Square Garden (19,812)
| 12–15
|- style="background:#cfc;"
| 28
| December 28
| New York
| 
| Kyle Lowry (32)
| Jonas Valančiūnas (10)
|  Kyle Lowry (11)
| Air Canada Centre (19,800)
| 13–15
|- style="background:#cfc;"
| 29
| December 31
| @ Chicago
| 
| Jonas Valančiūnas (15)
| Jonas Valančiūnas (9)
| Kyle Lowry (6)
| United Center (21,507)
| 14–15

|- style="background:#cfc;"
| 30
| January 1
| Indiana
| 
| DeMar DeRozan (26)
| DeRozan & Valančiūnas (9)
| Kyle Lowry (14)
| Air Canada Centre (18,271)
| 15–15
|- style="background:#cfc;"
| 31
| January 3
| @ Washington
| 
| DeMar DeRozan (20)
| Johnson & Valančiūnas (7)
| Kyle Lowry (11)
| Verizon Center (14,940)
| 16–15
|- style="background:#fcc;"
| 32
| January 5
| @ Miami
| 
| DeMar DeRozan (26)
| Amir Johnson (8)
| Kyle Lowry (9)
| American Airlines Arena (20,020)
| 16–16
|- style="background:#fcc;"
| 33
| January 7
| @ Indiana
| 
| DeMar DeRozan (28)
| Ross & Valančiūnas (8)
| DeMar DeRozan (6)
| Bankers Life Fieldhouse (16,147)
| 16–17
|-  style="background:#cfc;"
| 34
| January 8
| Detroit
| 
| Kyle Lowry (21)
| Johnson & Valančiūnas (11)
| Kyle Lowry (9)
| Air Canada Centre (16,194)
| 17–17
|- style="background:#cfc;"
| 35
| January 11
| Brooklyn
| 
| DeMar DeRozan (26)
| Patrick Patterson (12)
| DeMar DeRozan (5)
| Air Canada Centre (19,800)
| 18–17
|- style="background:#cfc;"
| 36
| January 13
| Milwaukee
| 
| Kyle Lowry (23)
| Jonas Valančiūnas (10)
| DeMar DeRozan (7)
| Air Canada Centre (15,819)
| 19–17
|- style="background:#fcc;"
| 37
| January 15
| @ Boston
| 
| DeMar DeRozan (23)
| DeRozan & Valančiūnas (8)
| Kyle Lowry (12)
| TD Garden (17,569)
| 19–18
|- style="background:#cfc;"
| 38
| January 17
| Minnesota
| 
| Kyle Lowry (24)
| Jonas Valančiūnas (11)
| Kyle Lowry (6)
| Air Canada Centre (19,800)
| 20–18
|- style="background:#fcc;"
| 39
| January 19
| L.A. Lakers
| 
| DeMar DeRozan (23)
| Valančiūnas & Patterson (7)
| Kyle Lowry (9)
| Air Canada Centre (17,706)
| 20–19
|- style="background:#fcc;"
| 40
| January 20
| @ Charlotte
| 
| DeMar DeRozan (25)
| Chuck Hayes (13)
| Greivis Vásquez (9)
| Time Warner Cable Arena (14,929)
| 20–20
|- style="background:#cfc;"
| 41
| January 22
| Dallas
| 
| DeMar DeRozan (40)
| Jonas Valančiūnas (10)
| Greivis Vásquez (7)
| Air Canada Centre (18,179)
| 21–20
|- style="background:#cfc;"
| 42
| January 24
| @ Philadelphia
| 
| DeMar DeRozan (34)
| Kyle Lowry (10)
| Kyle Lowry (10)
| Wells Fargo Center (11,489)
| 22–20
|- style="background:#fcc;"
| 43
| January 25
| L.A. Clippers
| 
| Terrence Ross (51)
| Jonas Valančiūnas (11)
| Kyle Lowry (12)
| Air Canada Centre (19,800)
| 22–21
|- style="background:#cfc;"
| 44
| January 27
| @ Brooklyn
| 
| Kyle Lowry (31)
| Jonas Valančiūnas (13)
| Kyle Lowry (6)
| Barclays Center (15,790)
| 23–21
|- style="background:#cfc;"
| 45
| January 29
| Orlando
| 
| Kyle Lowry (33)
| Jonas Valančiūnas (15)
| Kyle Lowry (11)
| Air Canada Centre (17,694)
| 24–21
|- style="background:#cfc;"
| 46
| January 31
| @ Denver
| 
| DeMar DeRozan (19)
| Amir Johnson (9)
| John Salmons (9)
| Pepsi Center (17,131)
| 25–21

|- style="background:#fcc;"
| 47
| February 1
| @ Portland
| 
| DeMar DeRozan (36)
| Patrick Patterson (9)
| DeMar DeRozan (12)
| Moda Center (19,996)
| 25–22
|- style="background:#cfc;"
| 48
| February 3
| @ Utah
| 
| DeMar DeRozan (23)
| Amir Johnson (11)
| DeRozan, Salmons & Vásquez (4)
| EnergySolutions Arena (17,139)
| 26–22
|- style="background:#fcc;"
| 49
| February 5
| @ Sacramento
| 
| Kyle Lowry (21)
| Jonas Valančiūnas (11)
| Kyle Lowry (8)
| Sleep Train Arena (17,317)
| 26–23
|- style="background:#fcc;"
| 50
| February 7
| @ L.A. Clippers
| 
| DeMar DeRozan (36)
| Jonas Valančiūnas (13)
| DeMar DeRozan (8)
| Staples Center (19,060)
| 26–24
|- style="background:#cfc;"
| 51
| February 10
| New Orleans
| 
| DeRozan & Patterson  (22)
| Jonas Valančiūnas (8)
| Kyle Lowry (12)
| Air Canada Centre (17,596)
| 27–24
|- style="background:#cfc;"
| 52
| February 12
| Atlanta
| 
| DeMar DeRozan (31)
| Jonas Valančiūnas (14)
| Kyle Lowry (13)
| Air Canada Centre (17,121)
| 28–24
|- align="center"
|colspan="9" bgcolor="#bbcaff"|All-Star Break
|- style="background:#cfc;"
| 53
| February 18
| @ Washington
| 
| Kyle Lowry (24)
| Patrick Patterson (6)
| Kyle Lowry (10)
| Verizon Center (15,624)
| 29–24
|- style="background:#fcc;"
| 54
| February 19
| Chicago
| 
| DeMar DeRozan (32)
| Tyler Hansbrough (7)
| Kyle Lowry (7)
| Air Canada Centre (17,704)
| 29–25
|- style="background:#cfc;"
| 55
| February 21
| Cleveland
| 
| Terrence Ross (20)
| Jonas Valančiūnas (8)
| Kyle Lowry (9)
| Air Canada Centre (18,854)
| 30–25
|- style="background:#cfc;"
| 56
| February 23
| Orlando
| 
| Kyle Lowry (28)
| Jonas Valančiūnas (9)
| Kyle Lowry (6)
| Air Canada Centre (17,435)
| 31–25
|- style="background:#cfc;"
| 57
| February 25
| @ Cleveland
| 
| DeMar DeRozan (33)
| Patrick Patterson (8)
| Kyle Lowry (9)
| Quicken Loans Arena (13,758)
| 32–25
|- style="background:#fcc;"
| 58
| February 27
| Washington
| 
| DeMar DeRozan (34)
| Jonas Valančiūnas (10)
| Kyle Lowry (10)
| Air Canada Centre (17,758)
| 32–26

|- style="background:#cfc;"
| 59
| March 2
| Golden State
| 
| DeMar DeRozan (32)
| Amir Johnson (9)
| Kyle Lowry (8)
| Air Canada Centre (18,658)
| 33–26
|- style="background:#cfc;"
| 60
| March 7
| Sacramento
| 
| Terrence Ross (18)
| Amir Johnson (9)
| Kyle Lowry (7)
| Air Canada Centre (18,188)
| 34–26
|- style="background:#cfc;"
| 61
| March 9
| @ Minnesota
| 
| DeMar DeRozan (25)
| Kyle Lowry (12)
| Kyle Lowry (11)
| Target Center (13,116)
| 35–26
|- style="background:#fcc;"
| 62
| March 10
| @ Brooklyn
| 
| Kyle Lowry (21)
| Kyle Lowry (8)
| Kyle Lowry (7)
| Barclays Center (17,351)
| 35–27
|- style="background:#cfc;"
| 63
| March 12
| Detroit
| 
| DeMar DeRozan (25)
| Jonas Valančiūnas (13)
| Kyle Lowry (6)
| Air Canada Centre (18,247)
| 36–27
|- style="background:#cfc;"
| 64
| March 14
| Memphis
| 
| Jonas Valančiūnas (23)
| Jonas Valančiūnas (9)
| Kyle Lowry (12)
| Air Canada Centre (18,465)
| 37–27
|- style="background:#fcc;"
| 65
| March 16
| Phoenix
| 
| Kyle Lowry (28)
| Valančiūnas & Lowry (5)
| Kyle Lowry (13)
| Air Canada Centre (18,717)
| 37–28
|- style="background:#fcc;"
| 66
| March 18
| @ Atlanta
| 
| DeMar DeRozan (29)
| Amir Johnson (11)
| Kyle Lowry (9)
| Philips Arena (11,759)
| 37–29
|- style="background:#cfc;"
| 67
| March 19
| @ New Orleans
| 
| DeMar DeRozan (31)
| Tyler Hansbrough (13)
| Kyle Lowry (5)
| Smoothie King Center (15,282)
| 38–29
|- style="background:#fcc;"
| 68
| March 21
| Oklahoma City
| 
| DeMar DeRozan (33)
| Jonas Valančiūnas (13)
| Johnson, Lowry & Vásquez (4)
| Air Canada Centre (19,800)
| 38–30
|- style="background:#cfc;"
| 69
| March 23
| Atlanta
| 
| Kyle Lowry (25)
| Jonas Valančiūnas (13)
| Greivis Vásquez (5)
| Air Canada Centre (18,140)
| 39–30
|- style="background:#fcc;"
| 70
| March 25
| @ Cleveland
| 
| Kyle Lowry (22)
| Amir Johnson (9)
| Kyle Lowry (10)
| Quicken Loans Arena (15,497)
| 39–31
|- style="background:#cfc;"
| 71
| March 26
| @ Boston
| 
| Terrence Ross (24)
| Jonas Valančiūnas (14)
| Kyle Lowry (4)
| TD Garden (18,341)
| 40–31
|- style="background:#cfc;"
| 72
| March 28
| Boston
| 
| DeMar DeRozan (30)
| Valančiūnas & Johnson (8)
| Lowry & Vásquez (5)
| Air Canada Centre (19,800)
| 41–31
|- style="background:#cfc;"
| 73
| March 30
| @ Orlando
| 
| DeMar DeRozan (28)
| Jonas Valančiūnas (9)
| Kyle Lowry (4)
| Amway Center (16,018)
| 42–31
|- style="background:#fcc;"
| 74
| March 31
| @ Miami
| 
| Greivis Vásquez (17)
| Jonas Valančiūnas (10)
| DeMar DeRozan (7)
| American Airlines Arena (19,831)
| 42–32

|- style="background:#cfc;"
| 75
| April 2
| Houston
| 
| DeMar DeRozan (29)
| Terrence Ross (9)
| Greivis Vásquez (8)
| Air Canada Centre (18,294)
| 43–32
|- style="background:#cfc;"
| 76
| April 4
| Indiana
| 
| Terrence Ross (24)
| Jonas Valančiūnas (9)
| DeMar DeRozan (9)
| Air Canada Centre (19,800)
| 44–32
|- style="background:#cfc;"
| 77
| April 5
| @ Milwaukee
| 
| Greivis Vásquez (26)
| Jonas Valančiūnas (12)
| Nando de Colo (6)
| BMO Harris Bradley Center (16,310)
| 45–32
|- style="background:#cfc;"
| 78
| April 9
| Philadelphia
| 
| Kyle Lowry (29)
| Jonas Valančiūnas (12)
| Kyle Lowry (8)
| Air Canada Centre (18,789)
| 46–32
|- style="background:#fcc;"
| 79
| April 11
| New York
| 
| DeMar DeRozan (26)
| Jonas Valančiūnas (21)
| DeMar DeRozan (5)
| Air Canada Centre (19,800)
| 46–33
|- style="background:#cfc;"
| 80
| April 13
| @ Detroit
| 
| DeMar DeRozan (30)
| Chuck Hayes (10)
| Kyle Lowry (7)
| Palace of Auburn Hills (16,944)
| 47–33
|- style="background:#cfc;"
| 81
| April 14
| Milwaukee
| 
| Greivis Vásquez (25)
| Jonas Valančiūnas (13)
| Greivis Vásquez (7)
| Air Canada Centre (18,821)
| 48–33
|- style="background:#fcc;"
| 82
| April 16
| @ New York
| 
| Kyle Lowry (22)
| Tyler Hansbrough (9)
| Lowry & Vásquez (5)
| Madison Square Garden (19,812)
| 48–34

Standings

Playoffs

Game log

|- style="background:#fcc;"
| 1
| April 19
| Brooklyn
| 
| Kyle Lowry (22)
| Jonas Valančiūnas (18)
| Kyle Lowry (8)
| Air Canada Centre (19,800)
| 0–1
|- style="background:#cfc;"
| 2
| April 22
| Brooklyn
| 
| DeMar DeRozan (30)
| Jonas Valančiūnas (14)
| Greivis Vásquez (8)
| Air Canada Centre (20,382)
| 1–1
|- style="background:#fcc;"
| 3
| April 25
| @ Brooklyn
| 
| DeMar DeRozan (30)
| Jonas Valančiūnas (10)
| Greivis Vásquez (6)
| Barclays Center (17,732)
| 1–2
|- style="background:#cfc;"
| 4
| April 27
| @ Brooklyn
| 
| DeMar DeRozan (24)
| Patrick Patterson (9)
| Greivis Vásquez (9)
| Barclays Center (17,732)
| 2–2
|- style="background:#cfc;"
| 5
| April 30
| Brooklyn
| 
| Kyle Lowry (36)
| Patrick Patterson (8)
| Kyle Lowry (6)
| Air Canada Centre (20,393)
| 3–2
|- style="background:#fcc;"
| 6
| May 2
| @ Brooklyn
| 
| DeMar DeRozan (28)
| Jonas Valančiūnas (9)
| DeRozan & Lowry (4)
| Barclays Center (17,732)
| 3–3
|- style="background:#fcc;"
| 7
| May 4
| Brooklyn
| 
| Kyle Lowry (28)
| Amir Johnson (10)
| DeMar DeRozan (6)
| Air Canada Centre (20,457)
| 3–4

Transactions

Trades

Waived

References

Toronto Raptors seasons
Toronto Raptors
Tor